is a Japanese politician of the Liberal Democratic Party (LDP), a member of the House of Representatives in the Diet (national legislature). A native of Kawanabe District, Kagoshima and graduate of the University of Tokyo, he joined the Ministry of Agriculture, Forestry and Fisheries. He was elected to the House of Representatives for the first time in 1990.

References 
 

1940 births
Living people
Politicians from Kagoshima Prefecture
University of Tokyo alumni
Members of the House of Representatives (Japan)
Liberal Democratic Party (Japan) politicians
21st-century Japanese politicians